Elizabeth Omoregie (born 29 December 1996) is a female handball player for CSM București and the Slovenian national team.

Omoregie was born and raised in Athens, Greece to a Nigerian father and Bulgarian mother. She was one of four children in the family, which moved to Pleven in Bulgaria, where she went to school.

In October 2017, it was announced that Omoregie obtained Slovenian citizenship and that she will play for the Slovenian national team.

On 27 April 2018, it was announced that she had signed with the Romanian team CSM București from the summer of the same year.

She represented Slovenia at the 2020 and the 2022 European Women's Handball Championship.

Awards and honors
National
Romanian Cup:
Winner: 2019, 2022
Romanian League:
Runner-up: 2019
Romanian Supercup:
Runner-up: 2018, 2021
Slovenian League:
Winner: 2015, 2017, 2018
Slovenian Cup:
Winner: 2015, 2016, 2017, 2018
Slovenian Supercup:
Winner: 2015, 2016, 2017
Continental
EHF Cup Winners' Cup:
Semifinalist: 2016 
Other
 Handball-Planet.com Young World Playmaker of the Season: 2017, 2018

References

External links

1996 births
Living people
Sportspeople from Athens
Bulgarian people of Nigerian descent
Expatriate handball players
Slovenian expatriate sportspeople in Romania
Bulgarian expatriate sportspeople in Slovenia
Bulgarian female handball players
Slovenian female handball players
Slovenian people of Nigerian descent
Slovenian people of Bulgarian descent
Naturalized citizens of Slovenia